This is a list of Italian football transfers for the 2007–08 season. Only moves from Serie A and Serie B are listed.

The summer transfer window ran from the end of the 2006–07 season, with a few transfers taking place prior to the season's complete end. The window closed on 31 August. The mid-season transfer window opened on 1 January 2008, and ran for the entire month, until 31 January. Players without a club may join one, either during or in between transfer windows.

Summer transfer window

Date unknown

July

August

Temp

1Player officially joined his new club on 1 July 2007.

See also
List of Italian football transfers winter 2007–08

Notes and references
 General

Specific

Italy
Tran
2007